The Correspondence with the Pretender Act 1697 (9 Will. 3 c. 1) was an Act of the Parliament of England which made it high treason to correspond with the deposed King James II. (This Act replaced an earlier Act of 1691.) When James II died and his son "James III" asserted his own claim to the throne, the Correspondence with James the Pretender (High Treason) Act 1701 was passed to replace this provision.

It was also treason under this Act for a person who had been to France since 11 December 1688, or performed military service for France or for James II, to return to England without a licence to do so.

See also
Jacobitism
High treason in the United Kingdom
Treason Act
Treason Act 1743

1697 in law
1697 in England
Treason in England
Acts of the Parliament of England
James II of England